Bibio longipes is a species of fly in the family Bibionidae. It is found in the Palearctic and the Nearctic.

References

Bibionidae
Insects described in 1864
Nematoceran flies of Europe
Taxa named by Hermann Loew